Hares Youssef (born 1964) is a businessman, philanthropist, writer and technology investor. He was one of former Ukrainian President Viktor Yushchenko's Middle East envoys during Yushchenko's 2005-2010 presidency.

Biography 
Youssef was born in Latakia, Syria, in 1964. At the age of 18, he was sent to Kyiv, Ukraine as a military cadet, fulfilling part of the exchange treaty obligations of military cooperation which at that point were in effect between Syria and the Soviet Union.

In 1994 he graduated from the Kyiv State University of Economics and started a business, which eventually spread to various sectors of the economy, in particular, real estate, metallurgy, industrial engineering, and energy.

In 1995, most of its industrial and commercial assets were united into a single holding - Hares Group Holding, registered in Austria. In 2004 the company's turnover reached 420 million dollars.

In 1999 Hares defended his PhD thesis at the Institute of World Economy and Foreign Affairs of the National Academy of Sciences of Ukraine.

In 2007 President Yushchenko appointed him his envoy and policy adviser for the Middle East.

In 2007 Hares entered the top 200 list of the most influential Ukrainians according to the Ukrainian weekly Focus.

In 2009, at the age of 45, Hares left most of his business assets in Ukraine and moved to Europe. There he founded two charity foundations: The 40 Foundation and Gaiia Foundation.

In 2020 Hares published his first book Gaiia. The philosophical, futurological novel, which was translated into four languages.

Business 
Hares Youssef has numerous links with the Lviv IT industry. He is currently working on the final stages of releasing the ‘Golden Hearts’ virtual currency.

Philanthropy 
Hares Youssef is a patron of many charities in Ukraine. He is a prominent collector of ancient Near Eastern art and antiquities. 
His private collection of Levantine antiquities is considered to be one of the most extensive held in private hands.

A close friend of the Syrian poet Adunis, he was the publisher of his magazine 'Another' between 2011 and 2013.

Over years, Mr. Youssef has been an active supporter of education initiatives under the auspices of the Foundation UNESCO Education for Children in Need. A variety of projects have been established with the support of Hares Youssef, such as the
Hares Youssef Boy school http://docdro.id/JK3FV5i and Hares Youssef Girls School. http://docdro.id/auI6MyY

His 40 Foundation focuses on supporting science advocacy.

Gaiia Foundation 

Gaiia Foundation is a multi-faceted project, with the final goal of creating a planetary digital platform for ensuring the vital activity of future economic, social, and financial systems. 

The project’s first phase is the platform for philanthropists, ecological activists and charities to raise funds by creating targeted coins as NFTs.

References 

Ukrainian businesspeople
1964 births
Living people
Syrian emigrants
People from Latakia